Al Hodge (21/12/1950 – 06/07/2006) was a Cornish guitarist, singer and songwriter, who had success with "Rock 'n' Roll Mercenaries", a song that was recorded by Meat Loaf with John Parr in 1986. Hodge co-wrote the song with the American, Michael Dan Ehmig.

Al Hodge was one of the most successful singer-songwriters to come out of Cornwall in recent years. For forty years Hodge, who was born in Bodmin, performed mostly in pubs and clubs. During the 1960s, he was guitarist for the band The Onyx. In the mid to late 1970s, he was a member of the soft rock band Rogue. He also did session work with Toyah Willcox, Sad Café, Randy Crawford, Linda Ronstadt, Clifford T. Ward and Suzi Quatro.

Hodge was a guitarist for Leo Sayer from 1981 to 1985. He was also a guitarist for Elkie Brooks in 1999 and 2000. He wrote music for numerous TV programmes and appeared on many TV shows throughout Europe.

In the years before he died, he taught many young guitarists in Cornwall. He died after a two-year battle with cancer on 6 July 2006.

In July 2007, the first Alstock Festival was held in his memory with one of the bands made up of Al Hodge's students. In June 2008, the second Alstock took place in Bodmin, Cornwall, with a much larger line-up of local bands and is now held every year on the last Saturday in July.

References

External links

 Cornish rock musician Hodge dies BBC news 7 July 2006.
 Al Hodge home page/obituary/etc.
BBC video clip from the 2003 Cropredy concert at Oxford

1951 births
2006 deaths
English male guitarists
English male singers
English songwriters
People from Bodmin
Deaths from cancer in England
20th-century English singers
20th-century British guitarists
20th-century British male singers
British male songwriters